Josiah Bushnell Grinnell (December 22, 1821 – March 31, 1891) was a U.S. Congressman from Iowa's 4th congressional district, an ordained Congregational minister, founder of Grinnell, Iowa and benefactor of Grinnell College.

Grinnell was born in New Haven, Vermont, in 1821. He studied first at Oneida Institute starting in 1841. He graduated from Auburn Theological Seminary in New York City in 1847. He held pastorates in Washington, D.C., and New York City before moving to Iowa. Grinnell was the young man to whom Horace Greeley is quoted as having given the famous advice, "Go West, young man." Grinnell was also involved in railway building and was instrumental in the move of Grinnell College, known at the time as Iowa College, from Davenport to the newly established town of Grinnell.

Grinnell married Julia Ann Chapin on February 4, 1852.  They had four children: Catharine Hastings Grinnell, George Chapin Grinnell, Mary Chapin Grinnell, and Carrie Holmes Grinnell.

In Iowa, Grinnell was elected to the Iowa Senate, where he served from 1856 to 1860. At the same time, he studied law, was admitted to the bar in 1858, and set up his legal practice in Grinnell. He was a delegate to the 1860 Republican National Convention that nominated Abraham Lincoln for President.

Grinnell was also a 'conductor' on the Underground Railroad and was associated with John Brown. He provided shelter to John Brown in 1859 after Brown's anti-slavery raids in Kansas and Missouri.

In 1862, after the 1860 census increased the number of U.S. House seats in Iowa from two to six, Grinnell ran for the newly created seat representing Iowa's 4th congressional district. The Fourth District was then a diamond-shaped configuration of twelve counties that included Newton and Iowa City, and ran from the Missouri border to the southern edge of Waterloo. After winning the Republican nomination and the general election in 1862, he served in the Thirty-eighth Congress. In 1864 he won re-election, serving in the Thirty-ninth Congress. On June 14, 1866, he was assaulted by fellow congressman Lovell Rousseau for insulting him and his home state of Kentucky during a House debate.

Grinnell lost the Republican nomination for a third term, losing by thirteen votes to Judge William Loughridge in June 1866.

After his service in Congress, Grinnell resumed the practice of law. He was also interested in the building of railroads, becoming a director of the Rock Island Railroad, and receiver of the Iowa Central Railroad (later the St. Louis & St. Paul Railroad). He also served as president of the Iowa State Horticultural Society and of the First National Bank in Grinnell.

He died of throat disease, complicated by asthma, at his home in Grinnell on March 31, 1891.  He was interred in Hazelwood Cemetery.

Works
 
Articles on his life and his obituary are available from the online resources from Drake Library in Grinnell, Iowa. Many additional materials are available in the Grinnell Room Archives at Drake Library.  An article in the Grinnell College Undergraduate Research Journal provides many biographical details as well as an extensive reference list.

See also
List of United States Congress members killed or wounded in office

References

External links

1821 births
1891 deaths
19th-century American clergy
19th-century American politicians
American Congregationalist ministers
Auburn Theological Seminary alumni
Congregationalist abolitionists
Grinnell College people
Republican Party Iowa state senators
Oneida Institute alumni
People from Grinnell, Iowa
People from New Haven, Vermont
People from Poweshiek County, Iowa
Republican Party members of the United States House of Representatives from Iowa
Underground Railroad people